The Eastern Conference of the Women's National Basketball Association is made up of six teams.

From the league's second season in 1998 through 2015, the WNBA operated separate playoff brackets for its Eastern and Western Conferences. Each conference's playoff was divided into two playoff rounds, the Conference Semi-Finals and the Conference Finals, with the Conference Finals winners receiving Conference Championships and advancing to the WNBA Finals to determine the WNBA champion. In the final years of this playoff scheme, all in-conference playoff series were best-of-three.

Since 2016, the league has abandoned separate conference playoffs in favor of a single league-wide playoff bracket. The top eight teams in the regular season, without regard to conference affiliation, advance to the playoffs, which are seeded based strictly on regular-season record (with tiebreakers as needed). The bottom four playoff teams play single-elimination games (5 vs. 8, 6 vs. 7) in the first round, with the higher seeds (5 and 6) hosting the games. The first-round winners advance to the second round, where they play the 3 and 4 seeds in single-elimination games. The 3 seed hosts the lower seed among the first-round winners, with the 4 seed hosting the other first-round survivor. The winners of these games advance to the WNBA Semifinals, where they face the top two seeds in best-of-five series. In this round, the 1 seed plays the lower seed among the second-round winners, and the 2 seed plays the other second-round winner. Both series are best-of-five and played in a 2–2–1 formet, with the higher seeds (1 and 2) hosting the first two games plus a possible fifth game. The winners of these series advance to the best-of-five WNBA Finals.

Teams

Former teams
Defunct
 Charlotte Sting (1997–2006)
 Cleveland Rockers (1997–2003)
 Miami Sol (2000–2002)
Changed to Western Conference
 Houston Comets
Relocated
 Orlando Miracle to Connecticut Sun (2003)
 Detroit Shock to Tulsa Shock (West) (2009); team now plays in the West as the Dallas Wings (2016)

Eastern Conference champions
The WNBA awarded conference championships between 1998 and 2015 to the winners of the Conference Finals in the playoffs. Conference championships were not awarded in the 1997 inaugural season, and they were again discontinued since the WNBA adopted its current single-table playoff format in 2016. 

WNBA champions in bold

 1998: Cleveland Rockers
 1999: New York Liberty
 2000: New York Liberty (2)
 2001: Charlotte Sting
 2002: New York Liberty (3)
 2003: Detroit Shock
 2004: Connecticut Sun
 2005: Connecticut Sun (2)
 2006: Detroit Shock (2)
 2007: Detroit Shock (3)
 2008: Detroit Shock (4)
 2009: Indiana Fever
 2010: Atlanta Dream
 2011: Atlanta Dream (2)
 2012: Indiana Fever (2)
 2013: Atlanta Dream (3)
 2014: Chicago Sky
 2015: Indiana Fever (3)

All-time regular-season conference standings

2019 season

2018 season

2017 season

2016 season

2015 season

2014 season

2013 season

2012 season

2011 season

2010 season

2009 season

2008 season

2007 season

2006 season

2005 season

2004 season

2003 season

2002 season

2001 season

2000 season

1999 season

1998 season

1997 season

References

Women's National Basketball Association